Clavomphalia is a genus of fungi in the family Tricholomataceae. It is a monotypic genus, containing only Clavomphalia yunnanensis, a Chinese species first described by German mycologist Egon Horak in 1987.

See also

 List of Tricholomataceae genera

References

Fungi of Asia
Tricholomataceae
Monotypic Agaricales genera
Taxa named by Egon Horak